A rack rail, or rack strip, is used to mount rackable electronic hardware and 19-inch rack mount accessories within a 19-inch rack. Within a rack a minimum of two rack rails are required to mount equipment. The height of rack rail is determined by the number of rack units required for mounting the equipment.

The design of racks and rack rails is specified in ECIA - EIA/ECA-310.

Most rack rail is in sizes from 2 units high to 54 units high.

Types
Rack Rail comes in two different commonly used forms. Tapped/threaded rack rail has round holes tapped for 10-32 UNF or 10-24 UNC screws. The other common form of rack rail is square hole rack strip which has square holes for captive nuts, available tapped for various different screw threads,  that are clipped into the holes as needed to mount equipment.

In both cases, rack screws and washers are required to mount rack mount equipment to the rack rail. The size and strength of rack rail is determined by its application. Increased thickness of steel results in stronger rack rail and varieties of rack rail can be found such as double angle and single angle rack rail.

References 

Computer enclosure
Server hardware